Limi is a Loloish language spoken in Yongde, Fengqing, and Yun counties of western Yunnan province, China.

Distribution
Limi is spoken in the following locations.
Yongde County (Wumulong 乌木龙彝族乡 and Yalian 亚练乡 Townships)
Southern Guodazhai Township 郭大寨彝族白族乡, Fengqing County (pop. 4,000)
Southeastern Yingpan Township 营盘镇, Fengqing County
Yun County (pop. 1,000)

Yang (2017) reports that Limi is spoken by about 20,000 people in Yongde, Fengqing, and Yun counties. Limi speakers make up 70% of the 26,000 people living in Wumulong Township (乌木龙乡), Yongde County, Yunnan. About 2,600 members of a nearby ethnic group called "Luo" (倮族) (likely Lolopo) also live in and around Wumulong.

Classification
Limi is likely most closely related to Lolopo, but also has many Lalo loanwords.

History
Limi speakers likely migrated from Jingdong County during the early 1300s, first arriving in Bangmai Village (邦卖/班卖), Fengqing County, and then later migrating to Wumulong Township, Yongde County.

References

 
 

Loloish languages
Languages of China